The Orwell site, designated 21OT7 in the state archaeological inventory, is a historic site located near Fergus Falls, Minnesota, United States. It consists of twelve Middle or Late Woodland period burial mounds, four of which are enclosed by an earthwork. They were built from about A.D. 350–600. They share similarities with the mounds found at Fort Juelson, also in Otter Tail County, with their central burial chamber. The site was listed on the National Register of Historic Places in 1974.

References

Mounds in Minnesota
Woodland period
Native American history of Minnesota
Protected areas of Otter Tail County, Minnesota
National Register of Historic Places in Otter Tail County, Minnesota
Archaeological sites on the National Register of Historic Places in Minnesota